Sidney MacEwen (born 18 November 1979) is a Canadian politician, who was elected to the Legislative Assembly of Prince Edward Island in the 2015 provincial election. He represents the electoral district of Morell-Donagh as a member of the Progressive Conservative Party.

MacEwen holds a degree in industrial engineering from Dalhousie University. Prior to his election to the legislature, he worked as a lobster and tuna fisherman, as a business consultant for MRSB Consulting and as chief of staff to former Progressive Conservative leader Olive Crane.

Electoral record

References

Living people
People from Kings County, Prince Edward Island
Progressive Conservative Party of Prince Edward Island MLAs
Dalhousie University alumni
21st-century Canadian politicians
1979 births